Clarence Munroe Clark (August 27, 1859 – June 29, 1937) was an American financier who helped develop electric light, power, and streetcar companies, as well as a noted tennis player.

Biography
Born in the Germantown section of Philadelphia, Pennsylvania, he was part of a distinguished family from Philadelphia. He graduated at age 19 from the University of Pennsylvania in 1878.

In 1881, he became the first secretary of the United States Lawn Tennis Association. That same year, he won the first doubles tournament in the U.S. National Championships (later called the U.S. Open), playing with Frederick Winslow Taylor, after defeating first the favored Richard Sears/James Dwight, and in the final round, Alexander Van Rensselaer/Arthur Newbold. In 1882, he reached the final of the championships, where he lost to reigning champion Sears in straight sets. Clark also reached the semifinals in 1884.

He married the sister of his doubles partner, Taylor, who would go on to a noted career as an engineer and organizational theorist.

In 1900, Clark became a partner in his family's firm, E. W. Clark & Co., placed in charge of public utility investments. "He was a pioneer in the development of electric light, electric power, and electric street railway companies," according to his obituary in the New York Times. At various times, he was a president of the Nashville Railway and Light Company, the Tennessee Electric Power Company, the Portland (Ore.) Electric Power Company, as well as a director or other official of many more companies.

Clark endowed a professorship in Mountain Agriculture at Berea College.

He died on June 29, 1937, at the age of 77, at his home, Cedron, in Germantown, Philadelphia.

He was inducted into the Tennis Hall of Fame in 1983, joining his brother Joseph Clark, who was inducted in 1955.

Clark shares a burial plot in the River section of West Laurel Hill Cemetery in Bala Cynwyd, PA, with his brother-in-law Frederick Winslow Taylor.

Grand Slam finals

Singles (1 runner-up)

References

External links 
 
 Image of Clark's house

1859 births
1937 deaths
19th-century American people
19th-century male tennis players
American male tennis players
Burials at West Laurel Hill Cemetery
University of Pennsylvania alumni
International Tennis Hall of Fame inductees
Tennis players from Philadelphia
United States National champions (tennis)
Grand Slam (tennis) champions in men's doubles
Clark banking family